Bartholomäus Metlinger (born in Augsburg – died c. 1491) was a German physician of the Late Middle Ages.

Metlinger graduated in 1470 from the University of Bologna. He was city physician in Nördlingen from 1476 to 1483, when he took the same position in Augsburg, probably succeeding his late father Peter Metlinger.

It was the first German-language work on pediatrics. In it, Metlinger deals with the care of infants and small children up to the age of seven. The book describes several childhood diseases and their treatments, besides providing educational advice. It also contains one of the first known written definitions of a pacifier.

See also 
 Eucharius Rösslin
 Felix Würtz
 Swaddling

Bibliography 
 Walter Martin Manzke: Remedia per infantibus: Medicinal child therapy in the 15th and 16th centuries, illustrated by means of selected diseases (dissertation in the Department of Pharmacy at the University of Marburg.). 2008. http://d-nb.info/987944800/34
 John Ruräh: Bartholomaeus Metlinger -1491. in American Journal of Diseases of Children, 35 (3), 1928, pp 492–494.
 Susanne Scheibenreiter: Diseases of the child in the Middle Ages (Unpublished thesis, University of Vienna, Faculty of History). 2008, 93 pages. http://othes.univie.ac.at/1341/1/2008-10-03_5600012.pdf

External links 
 Bartholomäus Metlinger on digitale-sammlungen.de

References 

German pediatricians
15th-century German physicians
15th-century educators
Education writers
German-language writers
Physicians from Augsburg
German medical writers
German male non-fiction writers
15th-century German writers

1490s deaths
Year of birth missing
Year of death uncertain